Endoplasmic reticulum aminopeptidase 2 is an aminopeptidase in humans involved in antigen presentation. It is encoded by the ERAP2 gene.

Function 

ERAP1 and ERAP2 are Aminopeptidases, able to trim precursors to antigenic peptides in the endoplasmic reticulum. They hydrolyze N-terminal amino acids of proteins or peptide substrates so the Major histocompatibility complex (MHC) class I can present them to CD8+ T cells.

ERAP2 plays a central role in antigen presentation and impacts the response of at least 4 cytokines: It is positively correlated with CCL3, which is involved in the recruitment of neutrophils upon infection, whereas it is inversely correlated with granulocyte colony-stimulating factor , interleukin-1β and IL-10.

Genetics
Mutations in the ERAP2 gene were found in DNA extracts derived from the skeletons of people who died shortly before, during or soon after the Black Death 1348 in three London cemeteries, including East Smithfield plague cemetery and from Denmark. Per this study, carrying two protective versions of ERAP2 made people 40 percent likelier to survive a Yersinia pestis infection. However this version of the gene also increases the risk of Crohn’s disease.

There is  evidence that the Black Death shaped genetic diversity in Europe, in that people who had protective variant of the ERAP2 gene were much more likely to survive Yersinia pestis infection, the causitive agent of Black Death.

See also 
 Major histocompatibility complex (MHC)
 Tripeptidyl peptidase

References

Further reading 

 
 
 
 
 
 
 
 
 

Genes on human chromosome 5